Selinia  may refer to:
 Selinia, Greece, a town near Ampelakia, Salamis Island, Greece
 Selinia (fungus), a fungus genus
Selinia Cojocaru